Styloleptus brunneofasciatus is a species of beetle in the family Cerambycidae. It was described by Fisher in 1935.

References

Styloleptus
Beetles described in 1935